The 1994 County Championship, known as the Britannic Assurance County Championship for sponsorship reasons, was the 95th officially organised running of the County Championship, and ran from 28 April to 19 September 1994. Each team played all the others in the division once. Warwickshire County Cricket Club claimed their fourth title as part of their record-breaking treble season.

Table

 Pld = Played, W = Wins, L = Losses, D = Draws, A = Abandonments, BatBP = Batting points, BowBP = Bowling points, Pts = Points.																
16 points for a win
8 points to each side for a tie
8 points to side still batting in a match in which scores finish level
Bonus points awarded in first 120 overs of first innings
Batting: 200 runs - 1 point, 250 runs - 2 points 300 runs - 3 points, 350 runs - 4 points
Bowling: 3-4 wickets - 1 point, 5-6 wickets - 2 points 7-8 wickets - 3 points, 9-10 wickets - 4 points
No bonus points awarded in a match starting with less than 8 hours' play remaining. A one-innings match is played, with the winner gaining 12 points.
Position determined by points gained. If equal, then decided on most wins.

Results

Records

Batting

References

1994 in English cricket
County Championship seasons
County